Giulio Cederna (date of birth unknown) was a footballer who played as goalkeeper in the early 1900s.

Cederna played for FC Basel's reserve team and advanced to their first team for their 1900–01 season. Cederna played his domestic league debut for the club in the home game on 17 February as Basel were defeated 2–3 by local rivals Old Boys.

In his one season with the team, Cederna played at least three games for Basel. Two of these games were in the Swiss Series A and one was a friendly game.

References

Sources
 Rotblau: Jahrbuch Saison 2017/2018. Publisher: FC Basel Marketing AG. 
 Die ersten 125 Jahre. Publisher: Josef Zindel im Friedrich Reinhardt Verlag, Basel. 
 Verein "Basler Fussballarchiv" Homepage

FC Basel players
Association football goalkeepers
Swiss Super League players
Date of birth missing
Date of death missing
Italian footballers